Malmö KK, Malmö Kappsimningsklubb, is a Swedish swim team from Malmö founded 1982 as competitive team for Malmö SS and Limhamns SS.

Swimmers
Jan Bidrman
Daniel Carlsson (2003-)
Attila Czene (2004)
Martin Gustavsson
Ida Mattsson
Stefan Persson
Henrik Jangvall

Divers
Jimmy Sjödin (1996)
Emilia Nilsson Garip

External links
MKK's Official Homepage 

Swimming clubs in Sweden
Sports clubs established in 1982
Sport in Malmö
1982 establishments in Sweden